Khatam al-Anbia Air Defense University AJA is a military academy located in Tehran, affiliated with Iran's Air Defense Force.
This University was established after separation of Air Defense Base from Islamic Republic of Iran Air Force in 2009. The main purpose of establishing this university is training educated officers in the various fields of Air Defense and providing specialized services to the Air Defense Force and other Armed Forces.

Fields and Faculties
Air Defense University has three faculty and educate cadet officers in these special fields.

Required Fields
Required fields for studying in Air Defense University includes:

Commandment
The first commander of Air Defense University was Colonel Moharram Qolizadeh, who died on 10 November 2011 of a heart attack. He was Deputy of Cyber Warfare of Air Defense Force. After him, Colonel Abbas Farajpour Alamdari was appointed for Air Defense University administrator.

References

External links 
 Homepage

Universities in Tehran
Islamic Republic of Iran Army
Military education and training in Iran
Military academies